José Daniel Santibáñez or JD Santibáñez (Guayaquil, 1959) is an Ecuadorian science fiction novelist and comic book writer.

Santibáñez is the author of the novels Ejecútese el mañana (2001;  Execute Tomorrow), and El mago (2003; The Magician). His book Cómic Book (2008; Comic Book) is a book containing 27 graphic stories of science fiction and crime.

Santibáñez studied Illustration at Parsons School of Design in New York. He is currently a professor at the Escuela Superior Politécnica del Litoral (ESPOL),  Universidad Santa María (USM) and Universidad de Especialidades Espíritu Santo (UEES).

Works
Novels
 Ejecútese el mañana (2001)
 El mago (2003)

Comic books
 Ecuador Ninja
 El Gato
 Guayaquil de mis temores
 Cómic Book

References 

1959 births
Living people
Ecuadorian male writers
People from Guayaquil